Hildre Church is a parish church of the Church of Norway in Ålesund Municipality in Møre og Romsdal county, Norway. It is located in the village of Hildrestranda. It is one of the two churches for the Brattvåg parish which is part of the Nordre Sunnmøre prosti (deanery) in the Diocese of Møre. The white, wooden church was built in a long church design in 1934 using plans drawn up by the architect Otto Hald. The church seats about 385 people.

See also
List of churches in Møre

References

Buildings and structures in Ålesund
Churches in Møre og Romsdal
Long churches in Norway
Wooden churches in Norway
20th-century Church of Norway church buildings
Churches completed in 1934
1934 establishments in Norway